"Soul to Squeeze" is a song by the American rock band Red Hot Chili Peppers that was originally recorded during the production of their fifth studio album, Blood Sugar Sex Magik (1991). Although it was not featured on the record and was used as a B-side on the singles "Give It Away" and "Under the Bridge", "Soul to Squeeze" was later released as a single in 1993. The song was included in the Coneheads film soundtrack. "Soul to Squeeze" was eventually re-released for the 2003 Greatest Hits album. It can also be found on the band's Live Rare Remix Box and The Plasma Shaft.

"Soul to Squeeze" became a success when it peaked at number one on the US Billboard Modern Rock Tracks chart. The single also peaked at number 22 on the Billboard Hot 100 and number seven on the Billboard Album Rock Tracks chart. In Australia, Canada, Iceland, and New Zealand, the song reached the top 10, and in Sweden, it became the band's first single to chart, peaking at number 13.

Music video
The music video for "Soul to Squeeze" was directed by Kevin Kerslake and was shot in black and white. The video is "set at a traveling circus with the band members playing various 'freaks' and makes several references to [Coneheads], including a cameo from Chris Farley". John Frusciante does not appear in the video, as he had left the band over a year before it was filmed.

Track listings
CD version 1
 "Soul to Squeeze"
 "Nobody Weird Like Me" (Live)
 "Suck My Kiss" (Live)

CD version 2 (card cover)
 "Soul to Squeeze"
 "Nobody Weird Like Me" (Live)

CD version 3 (EP)
 "Soul to Squeeze"
 "Nobody Weird Like Me" (Live)
 "If You Have to Ask" (Friday Night Fever Blister Mix)
 "If You Have to Ask" (Disco Krisco Mix)
 "If You Have to Ask" (Scott And Garth Mix)
 "If You Have to Ask"
 "Give It Away" (Edit)

7-inch jukebox vinyl
 "Soul to Squeeze"
 "Nobody Weird Like Me" (Live)

Cassette single
 "Soul to Squeeze"
 "Nobody Weird Like Me" (Live)

Charts

Weekly charts

Year-end charts

Decade-end charts

Certifications

Release history

See also
 Number one modern rock hits of 1993

References

1991 songs
1993 singles
Black-and-white music videos
Music videos directed by Kevin Kerslake
Red Hot Chili Peppers songs
Song recordings produced by Rick Rubin
Songs written by Anthony Kiedis
Songs written by Chad Smith
Songs written by Flea (musician)
Songs written by John Frusciante